Asianopis subrufa (also called the rufous net-casting spider) is a species of net-casting spiders. It occurs in Australia (Queensland, New South Wales, Victoria and Tasmania) and in New Zealand. It is a nocturnal hunter, having excellent eyesight, and hunts using a silken net to capture its prey. They feed on a variety of insects – ants, beetles, crickets and other spiders. They can vary in color from fawn to pinkish brown or chocolate brown. Females are about 25 mm in body length, males about 22 mm. They are not dangerous to humans.

This species is often found on a few strands of web in forest, woodland and heathland, or on flat surfaces, for example on the outside of houses.

Taxonomy
Asianopis subrufa was first described by Ludwig Koch in 1878. The generic name is a combination of the word "Asia", referring to the distribution and the genus Deinopis. The species name subrufa is Latin for "slightly reddish".

Mating

Males will usually shed their last skin and then seek a suitable female to mate with. They will rest on the outer skirts of the female's web, and will gently pluck the web to show her that they are interested. Days after mating, the female then constructs a globular egg sac, approximately 10-12 mm in diameter. It is generally a light brown or fawn color with black specks on it and contains anywhere from 100-200 eggs. It is usually disguised and protected by a leaf. Once the female has constructed the egg sac and laid the eggs, she will usually leave it to its own protection. After around 3 weeks, the young hatch.

Gallery

References

External links

 Pictures of A. subrufa
 Australian Biological Resources Study
 Australian Museum web site
 Australian Museum web site, Net-casting Spiders

Deinopidae
Spiders of Australia

Spiders described in 1878